Lekir (Jawi: لكير) is a mukim in Manjung District, Perak, Malaysia. Sufian Shukor is the Penghulu Mukim of Lekir.
Pantai Tanjung Kepah is small fisherman's beach in the village.

Manjung District
Mukims of Perak